Higher Porthpean is a village south of Duporth and contiguous with Lower Porthpean in Cornwall, England.  It has a small church, dedicated to St Levan that is a Grade II building, and that seats 48 people.  The church is a Chapel of ease to St Austell Parish Church.

References

External links

St Levan's Church, Porthpean

Hamlets in Cornwall